The 2022–23 Colorado Avalanche season is the 44th season for the National Hockey League (NHL) franchise that joined the league in 1979, 27th playing season since the franchise relocated from Quebec prior to the start of the 1995–96 NHL season, and 51st season overall, including their play in the World Hockey Association (WHA), where the franchise was established in 1972. They entered the season as the defending Stanley Cup champions.

Standings

Divisional standings

Conference standings

Schedule and results

Preseason

Regular season

Roster

Transactions
The Avalanche have been involved in the following transactions during the 2022–23 season.

Key:

 Contract is entry-level.
 Contract initially takes effect in the 2023–24 season.

Trades

Players acquired

Players lost

Signings

Draft picks

Below are the Colorado Avalanche's selections at the 2022 NHL Entry Draft, which was held on July 7 to 8, 2022, at Bell Centre in Montreal.

References

Colorado Avalanche seasons
Colorado Avalanche
Colorado Avalanche
Colorado Avalanche